Atlantis Airlines is a defunct airline based in Dakar, Senegal in Africa.

References

Defunct airlines of Senegal
Airlines established in 2001